The 1994–95 OB I bajnokság season was the 58th season of the OB I bajnokság, the top level of ice hockey in Hungary. Six teams participated in the league, and Ferencvarosi TC won the championship.

Regular season

Playoffs

3rd place
 Lehel HC Jászberény - Dunaferr Dunaújváros 0:2 (3:4, 2:5)

Final 
 Ferencvárosi TC - Alba Volán Székesfehérvár 2:1 (2:4, 3:2, 4:2)

External links
 Season on hockeyarchives.info

HUn
OB
OB I bajnoksag seasons